David Morgan Thulin (born 17 June 1983) is a Swedish music producer and film composer. He is known for his Reconstruction album series, multiple chart-topping hits on US Christian and indie radio, and various film/TV credits.

Early and personal life
Thulin was born, David Morgan Thulin, on June 17, 1983, in Naverstad, Sweden, while the family would immigrate to Vero Beach, Florida, in 1991. He began to seriously hone his piano acumen, when he turned 12. Thulin is married to Racheal, where they reside in Nashville, Tennessee.

Music career
His music recording career start in 2002, while he did not gain notoriety for his music, until 2013, when he released the first installment of the Reconstruction series of albums. The first album, Reconstruction, was released on 23 April 2013, from Dream Records. His subsequent album, Reconstruction, Vol. 2.1, was released on 7 January 2014, with Dream Records. He released, Reconstruction, Vol. 2.2, on 30 September 2014, from Dream Records.

Discography
Notable albums
 Reconstruction (23 April 2013, Dream)
 Reconstruction, Vol. 2.1 (7 January 2014, Dream)
 Reconstruction, Vol. 2.2 (30 September 2014, Dream)

Other notable works
 Light in Me (Feat. Nicole Croteau) – The Remixes (6 May 2014, Dream)
 Architecture (Jonathan Thulin) - The White Room (2013, Dream) Reached No. 1 on US Christian AC/CHR chart
 Dead Come to Life (Jonathan Thulin) - The White Room (2013, Dream) Reached No. 1 on US Christian AC/CHR chart
 #LITO (Press Play) - #LITO (2013, Dream) Reached No. 8 on US Christian AC/CHR chart 
 His Daughter (Molly Kate Kestner) (2015, Broken Phone Productions) Kestner caught the attention of Star Trek's George Takei, commenting on social media, "Has America found its young Adele? I'm nearly breathless from listening." After receiving attention from singer Jordin Sparks, Kestner performed the song on Good Morning America.  
 Wide Awake (Joel Vaughn) - Kinetic'' (2016 Dream) Reached No. 30 on US Christian AC/CHR chart and No. 1 on Australia's TCM charts.

References

External links
 Official website

1983 births
Living people
Swedish Christians
Swedish composers
Swedish male composers
Swedish dance musicians
Swedish electronic musicians
Swedish record producers
Swedish songwriters
Performers of Christian electronic dance music